Australaugeneria michaelseni is a scale worm known from northern Australia and Papua New Guinea from depths of 30m or less.

Description
Number of segments 36; elytra 15 pairs. Depigmented. Lateral antennae inserted ventrally (beneath prostomium and median antenna). Notochaetae about as thick as neurochaetae. Bidentate neurochaetae absent.

Commensalism
Australaugeneria michaelseni is commensal. Its host taxa are alcyonacean corals.

References

Phyllodocida